The 1995–96 Northern Premier League season was the 28th in the history of the Northern Premier League, a football competition in England. Teams were divided into two divisions; the Premier and the First. It was known as the Unibond League for sponsorship reasons.

Premier Division 

The Premier Division featured three new teams:

 Bamber Bridge promoted as runners up from Division One
 Blyth Spartans promoted as champions from Division One
 Leek Town transferred from the Southern League Premier Division

League table

Results

Division One 

Division One featured four new teams:
 Bradford Park Avenue promoted as champions from the NWCFL Division One
 Leigh RMI relegated from the Premier Division
 Lincoln United promoted as champions from the NCEFL Premier Division
 Whitley Bay relegated from the Premier Division

League table

Promotion and relegation 

In the twenty-eighth season of the Northern Premier League Bamber Bridge should have been (as champions) automatically promoted to the Football Conference, but were not as they did not meet the Conference's requirements. Droylsden and Matlock Town were relegated to the First Division; these two clubs were replaced by relegated Conference side Runcorn, First Division winners Lancaster City and second placed Alfreton Town. In the First Division Fleetwood folded at the end of the season and were replaced by newly admitted Stocksbridge Park Steels and Flixton.

Cup Results
Challenge Cup: Teams from both leagues.

Hyde United bt. Leek Town

President's Cup: 'Plate' competition for losing teams in the NPL Cup.

Worksop Town bt. Guiseley

Northern Premier League Shield: Between Champions of NPL Premier Division and Winners of the NPL Cup.

Hyde United bt. Bamber Bridge

References

External links 
 Northern Premier League Tables at RSSSF

Northern Premier League seasons
6